Idrætscenter Vest is an indoor sports arena in Holstebro, Denmark primarily used for handball. The arena can hold 2,300 spectators (app. 1000 seated) and was the former home to Danish Handball League side Team Tvis Holstebro.

External links
Idrætscenter Vest

Handball venues in Denmark
Indoor arenas in Denmark
Holstebro